People Like You Records (also known as I Used To Fuck People Like You In Prison Records) is a rock record label founded by Andre Bahr in 1999. The label is independent, but it belongs to the Century Media Records. The office for People Like You is located in Dortmund, North Rhine-Westphalia.

Artists 
 Blitzkid
 Bloodlights
 Callejon
 Demented Are Go
 Eskimo Callboy
 Mad Sin
 The Meteors
 The Peacocks
 Red Aim
 Roger Miret and the Disasters
 Slime
 U.S. Bombs

References

External links 
 

German record labels
Record labels established in 1999
Punk record labels
Psychedelic rock record labels
Rock and roll record labels
Heavy metal record labels
1999 establishments in Germany